Alfred Schouppé (born December 13, 1812 in Grabownica Starzeńska, died April 7, 1899 in Krynica-Zdrój) was a Polish painter, and one of the founders of the Society for the Encouragement of Fine Arts (Towarzystwo Zachęty Sztuk Pięknych) in Warsaw.

Biography
Studied in Kraków, where he was a student of Jan Nepomucen Głowacki and Józef Richter in Warsaw. In 1837, by gaining a scholarship Schouppé began studying at the Accademia di San Luca, returning to Warsaw in 1840. He took part in a number of foreign travels, and after going into retirement in 1897 he moved out of Warsaw. Nearly every year he visited the Tatra Mountains. His Tatra landscape paintings are characterised with idealism. He also painted religious paintings and had been illustrating with Juliusz Kossak.

Selected paintings

References

External links

1812 births
1899 deaths
19th-century Polish painters
19th-century Polish male artists
Polish male painters